Tina Røe Skaar (born 31 August 1993) is a Norwegian taekwondo practitioner. 

She qualified for competing at the 2016 Summer Olympics in Rio de Janeiro, by winning the +67kg class in the 2016 European Taekwondo Olympic Qualification Tournament, after winning her matches against Nafia Kuş, Olga Ivanova and Reshmie Oogink.

References

External links

1993 births
Living people
Norwegian female taekwondo practitioners
European Games competitors for Norway
Taekwondo practitioners at the 2015 European Games
21st-century Norwegian women